Excirolana chiltoni is a species of isopod in the family Cirolanidae.

They live in the ocean at the shoreline, being commonly described as a "water-line isopod" and occasionally swarm and bite (people and animals), vigorously.

References

Cymothoida
Crustaceans of the Pacific Ocean
Crustaceans described in 1905